The 1998–99 Austrian Cup was the 65th season of Austria's nationwide football cup competition. The final was held at the Ernst-Happel-Stadion, Vienna on 18 May 1999.

The competition was won by Sturm Graz after beating LASK Linz 4–2 on penalties after the match finished 1-1 after extra time.

First round

|}

Second round
The second round games were played on August 21 – 23, 1998.

|-
|colspan="3" style="background-color:#fcc;"|

|-
|colspan="3" style="background-color:#fcc;"|

|}

Matches

Third round
The third-round games were played on September 4 – 17, 1998.

|-
|colspan="3" style="background-color:#fcc;"|

|-
|colspan="3" style="background-color:#fcc;"|

|-
|colspan="3" style="background-color:#fcc;"|

|-
|colspan="3" style="background-color:#fcc;"|

|}

Matches

Fourth round

The fourth-round games were played on October 31, 1998.

|-
|colspan="3" style="background-color:#fcc;"|

|}

Matches

Quarter-finals
The games were played on April 6, 1999.

|-
|colspan="3" style="background-color:#fcc;"|

|}

Matches

Semi-finals
The games were played on May 5, 1999.

|-
|colspan="3" style="background-color:#fcc;"|

|}

Matches

Final

Details

External links
 RSSSF page
 Austriasoccer.at page

References

Austrian Cup seasons
Cup
Austrian Cup, 1998-99